Àngel Rodamilans i Canals (1 May 1874 in Sabadell – 27 July 1936 in Serra d'en Camaró, Sabadell) was a Catalan Benedictine monk and composer of religious music. He, as were also 22 other Benedictine monks, was a victim of religious assassination during the Spanish Civil War and counted by the Catholic church as a "servant of God" in the process of beatification of the Martyrs of the Spanish Civil War.

Works, editions and recordings
 Àngel Rodamilans: songs - Amor. El Bàlsam. Anem a Bethlem. El nom de Maria. on Jacint Verdaguer i el lied català. M. Teresa Garrigosa, soprano ; Emili Blasco, piano La mà de Guido, 2005. with Felip Pedrell Sospir. Les cinc roses Antoni Nicolau Raïms i espigues. Cançó de la Moreneta; Narcisa Freixas Lo filador d'or. Francesc Alió Cançó de l'estrella ; Plor de la tòrtora Joan Lamote de Grignon On sou mon Jesús? Juli Garreta Records i somnis. Pablo Casals Lo lliri blanc. Tomàs Buxó La filadora. Oidà pescadors. Antoni Massana En l'enterro d'un nin. Resignació.

See also

References

1874 births
1936 deaths
Composers from Catalonia
Spanish Benedictines
Martyrs of the Spanish Civil War